Llanos de Olivenza is a  comarca in the province of Badajoz in the autonomous community of Extremadura, western Spain. It borders with Portugal in the west.

Municipalities
 Alconchel 
 Almendral
 Barcarrota
 Cheles
 Higuera de Vargas
 Nogales
 Olivenza
 Táliga
 Torre de Miguel Sesmero
 Valverde de Leganés
 Villanueva del Fresno

External links
Profile 

Comarcas of Extremadura
Geography of the Province of Badajoz